Imunidade Musical (Portuguese for "Musical Immunity") is the seventh studio album by Brazilian alternative rock band Charlie Brown Jr., released on August 23, 2005 through EMI. Following a brief hiatus after the departure of former bandmembers Champignon, Marcão and Renato Pelado, it was the band's first release with its new line-up of bassist Heitor Gomes, drummer/beatboxer André Pinguim and guitarist Thiago Castanho, an original founding member who had parted ways with Charlie Brown Jr. in 2001 following the release of their third album, Nadando com os Tubarões.

It spawned four hit singles, the most noteworthy being "Lutar pelo que É Meu" (used as the theme song of the 13th season of long-running soap opera Malhação), "Ela Vai Voltar (Todos os Defeitos de uma Mulher Perfeita)" (featured in the 21st season of the soap opera but not included in its soundtrack CD) and "Pra Não Dizer que Não Falei das Flores", a cover of the famous anti-dictatorship song written by Geraldo Vandré in the late 1960s. "Aquela Paz" was re-recorded from their 1997 debut Transpiração Contínua Prolongada. Counting with guest appearances by Rappin' Hood, hip hop group Sacramento MCs and Nigerian-born musician Osas Destiny (at the time still a member of group Conexão Baixada and credited by his former stage name JamaicaBoy), the album was received positively upon its release, with many praising the new line-up as a "breath of fresh air". It sold over 100,000 copies, receiving a Gold certification by Pro-Música Brasil.

In 2006, Imunidade Musical was nominated for a Latin Grammy Award for Best Portuguese Language Rock or Alternative Album; it was the band's third album to receive a nomination following Nadando com os Tubarões and Bocas Ordinárias. The same year, the music video for "Ela Vai Voltar (Todos os Defeitos de uma Mulher Perfeita)" received nominations for the MTV Video Music Brazil award in the "Video of the Year", "Best Rock Video" and "Best Art Direction in a Video" categories; director Leonardo Domingues was nominated in the "Best Direction in a Video" category.

Critical reception
Anderson Nascimento of Galeria Musical gave the album a positive rating of 4 out of 5 stars, praising it as one of the most "complete and inspired" releases by Charlie Brown Jr. but criticizing its length.

Track listing

Personnel
 Charlie Brown Jr.
 Chorão – vocals
 Heitor Gomes – bass guitar
 Thiago Castanho – electric guitar
 André Pinguim – drums, beatboxing

 Additional musicians
 JamaicaBoy – vocals in "Na Palma da Mão (O Ragga da Baixada)"
 Rappin' Hood – vocals in "Cada Cabeça Falante Tem sua Tromba de Elefante"
 Sacramento MCs – vocals in "Green Goes"

Certifications

References

2005 albums
EMI Records albums
Charlie Brown Jr. albums
Albums produced by Rick Bonadio